Dublin Central is a parliamentary constituency represented in Dáil Éireann, the lower house of the Irish parliament or Oireachtas. The constituency elects 4 deputies (Teachtaí Dála, commonly known as TDs) on the system of proportional representation by means of the single transferable vote (PR-STV).

Constituency profile
Dublin Central is regarded as one of the most social and ethnically diverse constituencies in Ireland. It contains Dublin's main shopping district and financial areas. The constituency consists of largely traditional working class areas such as East Wall, North Strand, Summerhill, Ballybough, Sheriff Street and Cabra with more suburban middle class Glasnevin and Lower Drumcondra on the northern fringes of the constituency.

Former Taoiseach Bertie Ahern won the first seat in the constituency at every election from its creation in 1981 until his retirement in 2011. It was a highly competitive constituency with the Labour Party, Sinn Féin and left-wing independents such as Tony Gregory drawing much support. Fianna Fáil have not been represented in the constituency since the 2011 general election.

History
A Dublin Central constituency was created for the first time in 1969 and used at the 1969 and 1973 general elections. It originally spanned both sides of the River Liffey and took in inner city Dublin. It was abolished in 1977, and recreated with different boundaries in 1981. It is now exclusively on the northside of the Liffey. The Dublin Central constituency is located in the north inner city and suburbs of Dublin and encompasses an area to the north side of the river Liffey including: Stoneybatter, Mountjoy Square, Phibsborough, Cabra, Dorset Street, Henrietta Street, O'Connell Street, Arbour Hill, Navan Road, Glasnevin, North Wall, East Wall and Drumcondra.

TDs

TDs 1969–1977

TDs since 1981

Elections

2020 general election

2016 general election

2011 general election

2009 by-election
Following the death of independent TD Tony Gregory, a by-election was held on 5 June 2009. It was won by Independent candidate Maureen O'Sullivan.

2007 general election

2002 general election

1997 general election

1992 general election

1989 general election

1987 general election

1983 by-election
Following the death of Fianna Fáil TD George Colley, a by-election was held on 23 November 1983. It was won by Fianna Fáil candidate Tom Leonard.

November 1982 general election

February 1982 general election

1981 general election

1973 general election

1969 general election

See also
Elections in the Republic of Ireland
Politics of the Republic of Ireland
List of Dáil by-elections
List of political parties in the Republic of Ireland

References

External links
Oireachtas Constituency Dashboards
Oireachtas Members Database
Dublin Historic Maps: Parliamentary & Dail Constituencies 1780-1969 (a work in progress)
Dublin Historic Maps: Dublin Wards

Dáil constituencies
Parliamentary constituencies in County Dublin
1969 establishments in Ireland
1977 disestablishments in Ireland
Constituencies established in 1969
Constituencies disestablished in 1977
1981 establishments in Ireland
Constituencies established in 1981
Politics of Dublin (city)